Albin Lagergren (born 11 September 1992) is a Swedish handball player for Rhein-Neckar Löwen and the Swedish national team.

He participated at the 2017 World Men's Handball Championship.

References

External links

1992 births
Living people
Swedish male handball players
People from Varberg
Redbergslids IK players
IFK Kristianstad players
Expatriate handball players
Swedish expatriate sportspeople in Germany
Handball-Bundesliga players
SC Magdeburg players
Rhein-Neckar Löwen players
Handball players at the 2016 Summer Olympics
Handball players at the 2020 Summer Olympics
Olympic handball players of Sweden
Sportspeople from Halland County
21st-century Swedish people